KK Partizan is Serbian professional basketball club based in Belgrade, Serbia. They play in Basketball League of Serbia, Adriatic League and Euroleague. Partizan  have played their home games at the Pionir Hall since 1992. In addition to Pionir Hall, Partizan also plays their home games in Kombank Arena. Partizan is the most successful basketball club in Serbia, having won total of 48 official trophies.

There have been 34 head coaches for Partizan since the founding of the club in 1945. The first head coach was Božo Grkinić who coached Partizan for two seasons. The first coach to bring Partizan official trophy was Borislav Ćorković. He won Yugoslav League with Partizan in 1976. Club won the first international trophy in 1978, while being coached by Ranko Žeravica. Željko Obradović lead the club to the most significant trophy, Euroleague in 1992. Duško Vujošević is the most successful coach in club's history. In his four stints with Partizan he won total of 23 trophies. Borislav Stanković and Ranko Žeravica are members of FIBA Hall of Fame, while Aleksandar Nikolić is a member of Basketball Hall of Fame. Furthermore, Nikolić, Dušan Ivković and Željko Obradović have been named among 50 Greatest Euroleague Contributors.

Key

Coaches

References 
1.http://www.kkpartizan.rs/trofeji/

External links
  

Partizan